Nacim Mustapha Abdelali, sometimes spelt Nassim Mustapha Abdelaali, (born 19 December 1981) is a French footballer. He currently plays for Yverdon-Sport FC in the 1. Liga Promotion.

On 28 February 2010, Abdelali made his league début for Nyíregyháza Spartacus in a 3–2 win over Vasas SC.

References

External links

1981 births
Living people
Sportspeople from Aix-en-Provence
French sportspeople of Algerian descent
French footballers
Algerian footballers
Association football midfielders
Algerian expatriate footballers
French expatriate footballers
Chamois Niortais F.C. players
Expatriate footballers in France
Expatriate footballers in Switzerland
Ligue 2 players
Gap HAFC players
Algerian expatriate sportspeople in France
USM Blida players
Expatriate footballers in Hungary
Nemzeti Bajnokság I players
Nyíregyháza Spartacus FC players
French expatriate sportspeople in Hungary
Algerian expatriate sportspeople in Hungary
Algerian expatriate sportspeople in Switzerland
Yverdon-Sport FC players
Footballers from Provence-Alpes-Côte d'Azur